Cryptanthus osiris is a plant species in the genus Cryptanthus. This species is native to Brazil.

Cultivars
 Cryptanthus 'Rainbow Star'

References

BSI Cultivar Registry Retrieved 11 October 2009

osiris
Flora of Brazil